Oberfähnrich (short: OFähnr / in lists: OFR; en: Senior-fähnrich) was a military rank in the Army of the German Democratic Republic (GDR) from 1979 to 1990. Oberfähnrich did belong to the autonomous "Fähnrich rank group" between commissioned officer (CO) and non-commissioned officer (NCO) ranks. The position of the "Fähnrich rank group" might have been compared to the Warrant Officer (WO) rank group in Anglophone armed forces.

The official manner, in line to NPA Handboock, of formal addressing of military people with the rank Oberfähnrich was Genosse/Genossin Oberfähnrich (en: comrade Obrfähnrich). 

The bottom up approach in that rank group was as follows:
Fähnrich  WO-1, (en: Fähnrich)
 Oberfähnrich WO-2, (Senior-fähnrich)
Stabsfähnrich WO-3, (Staff-fähnrich)
Stabsoberfähnrich WO-4, (Staff-senior-fähnrich)

⇒ see main article Ranks of the National People's Army

References 

 Glossary of German military terms

Military of East Germany
Military ranks of Germany